Clinanthus elwesii is a species of plant in the family Amaryllidaceae. It is native to Peru.
John Gilbert Baker, the English botanist who first formally described the species using the synonymous name Callithauma viridiflorum var. elwesii, named it in after Henry John Elwes, another English botanist who grew the specimen Baker examined.

Description
A herbaceous plant.  Prominent characteristics include flowers with a corolla which consists of six connate tepals.

Reproductive biology
The pollen of  C. elwesii is shed as permanent tetrads.

References

elwesii
Flora of Peru
Plants described in 1878
Taxa named by Alan Meerow
Taxa named by John Gilbert Baker